Bremang is a town in the Ashanti Region of Ghana.

Places
Bremang in the Ashanti Region
Breman Asikuma in the Central Region